The Man in the Gray Flannel Suit is a 1956 American drama film based on the 1955 novel The Man in the Gray Flannel Suit by Sloan Wilson. The film focuses on Tom Rath, a young World War II veteran trying to balance his marriage and family life with the demands of a career while dealing with the after-effects of his war service and a new high-pressure job. The film stars Gregory Peck as Rath and Jennifer Jones as his wife Betsy, with Fredric March, Lee J. Cobb, Keenan Wynn and Marisa Pavan in supporting roles. It was entered at the 1956 Cannes Film Festival.

Plot
Ten years after the end of World War II Tom Rath (Gregory Peck) is living in suburban Connecticut with his wife Betsy (Jennifer Jones) and three children. He's having difficulty supporting his family to his wife’s ambitions on his salary writing for a Manhattan nonprofit foundation. In addition to his troubled marriage Tom is also dealing with post-traumatic stress syndrome, depicted in the form of frequent and disquieting flashbacks from his combat service as an Army captain in both the European and Pacific theaters. These include actions where he killed men in combat (including, by accident, his best friend), and an affair with a young Italian girl named Maria (Marisa Pavan), with whom he had a brief relationship despite his being involved with Betsy at the time.

When a hoped-for inheritance from Tom's recently deceased grandmother turns out to have been depleted, leaving only her large and unsaleable estate, Betsy pressures Tom to seek a higher-paying job. Acting on a tip from a fellow train commuter, he applies for an opening in public relations at television network United Broadcasting Company (UBC). Asked to write his autobiography as part of the interview process, he defers in favor of a simple declaration that he wants the job, expects he can grow into it, and will be happy to answer any questions directly related to his application. His forthrightness catches the attention of founding network president Ralph Hopkins (Fredric March), who seeks his help in launching a national mental health campaign Hopkins holds dear. Hopkins is powerful and highly respected, but a workaholic whose success has been at the expense of his family life, leaving him estranged from his wife and rebellious daughter, who soon elopes with an unsuitable man. He is drawn to Tom’s frankness and physical traits that remind him of the beloved son he lost in World War II.

Tom is initially supervised by Bill Ogden (Henry Daniell), an oily micromanager and office politician who rejects Tom's drafts of an important speech Hopkins intends to launch the campaign with, substituting his own platitude-filled draft of what Ogden thinks Hopkins wants to hear. Aware the impetus for that pitch came from Hopkins himself, and dangerously pressured by Ogden, Tom plans to play along and accept that draft, but, coaxed by Betsy, presents his original ideas to Hopkins instead. Hopkins is both stunned and intrigued by Tom's incisive approach and naked candor, but their meeting at Hopkins' city suite is interrupted by the unwelcome news that his daughter has eloped. Deeply disturbed, Hopkins becomes reflective, and relates to Tom that his son "did the right thing" and refused a commission in World War II and was subsequently killed in action as an enlisted man. Hopkins now regrets having ignored his family and advises Tom not to make the same mistake.

Betsy abruptly sells the family's modest suburban home and moves them into Tom's late grandmother's mansion, which she chides as "Dragonwyck". Complications immediately ensue when Edward (Joseph Sweeney), the old woman's longtime caretaker, claims that Tom's grandmother had bequeathed him the estate. Judge Bernstein (Lee J. Cobb) intercedes and presents evidence which suggests that not only did Edward forge the bequest letter, but he also padded his bills, thus depleting the estate and accumulating a large fortune that he could not otherwise explain. The Raths are able to keep the house.

At his new job, Tom runs into elevator operator Caesar (Keenan Wynn), his sergeant in Italy. Caesar is married to the cousin of his Italian flame Maria, and tells Tom that Maria and her son by Tom are desperate for money in their still war-ravaged country. Tom has kept his affair and possible child a secret from Betsy, but, goaded that evening by her admonition to always tell the truth, he now tells her. Betsy reacts angrily and speeds away recklessly in the family car.

The following morning, South Bay police call to tell Tom that they have Betsy, who ran out of gas during her flight. Hopkins then calls to ask Tom to accompany him on a trip to California in support of the new campaign. Tom declines, saying that he just wants to "work 9 to 5 and spend the rest of the time with my family", a decision Hopkins respectfully but ruefully accepts.

Tom retrieves Betsy and they reconcile. The couple then go to Judge Bernstein to set up a third-person conduit for sending funds to Tom's son in Italy. They leave together, embrace, and kiss.

Cast

 Gregory Peck as Tom Rath
 Jennifer Jones as Betsy Rath
 Fredric March as Ralph Hopkins
 Marisa Pavan as Maria Montagne
 Lee J. Cobb as Judge Bernstein
 Ann Harding as Helen Hopkins
 Keenan Wynn as Sgt. Caesar Gardella
 Gene Lockhart as Bill Hawthorne
 Gigi Perreau as Susan Hopkins
 Portland Mason as Janey Rath
 Arthur O'Connell as Gordon Walker
 Henry Daniell as Bill Ogden
 Connie Gilchrist as Mrs. Manter
 Joseph Sweeney as Edward M. Schultz
 Sandy Descher as Barbara Rath

Reception
Contemporary reviews of the film were somewhat mixed. Bosley Crowther of The New York Times declared it "a mature, fascinating and often quite tender and touching film." Variety wrote that the film "often seems episodic and it's over-long," finding Johnson's direction "uneven" and holding him "responsible for the fact that the picture so determinedly misses the point of the book which made the flannel suit a symbol rather than just a garment." Harrison's Reports called it "one of the most absorbing pictures of the year," with "exceptionally fine" acting. John McCarten of The New Yorker thought the film was too long and suggested that the flashbacks should have been trimmed, concluding that "if it were an old-fashioned serial, I'm sure we might have been able to tolerate it. In one massive dose, though, it's just too damned much, and I think you'd be better off taking a tranquilizer pill than going through all this for the sake of escaping the world and its woes." The Monthly Film Bulletin wrote: "As a sociological document, a particular view of the contemporary American middle-class scene, the film is uneasily fascinating. Otherwise, this is a characteristic best-seller adaptation, over-long, over-loaded with 'production values', padded out with flashbacks to the war years, and efficiently impersonal in its approach."

The film, like the novel on which it was based, became hugely popular with the public. Historian Robert Schultz argues that the film and the novel are cultural representations of what Adlai Stevenson had described in 1955 as a "crisis in the western world", "collectivism colliding with individualism," the collective demands of corporate organizations against traditional roles of spouse and parent. That increased corporate organization of society, Schultz notes, reduced white-collar workers' (represented by Tom Rath and the other gray-suited "yes men") control over what they did and how they did it as they adapted to the "organized system" described and critiqued by contemporary social critics such as Paul Goodman, C. Wright Mills, and William H. Whyte.

See also
 List of American films of 1956

References

External links
 
 
 
 
 

1956 drama films
1956 films
20th Century Fox films
American business films
American drama films
Films scored by Bernard Herrmann
Films about advertising
Films about businesspeople
Films about veterans
Films set in 1955
Films based on American novels
Films directed by Nunnally Johnson
Films produced by Darryl F. Zanuck
Films set in Connecticut
Films with screenplays by Nunnally Johnson
Westport, Connecticut
CinemaScope films
1950s English-language films
1950s American films